Refrontolo (Venetian: Refróntol) is a comune (municipality) in the Province of Treviso in the Italian region Veneto, located about  north of Venice and about  north of Treviso, representing the third smallest municipality by number of inhabitants (1,732) in the province, preceded only by Portobuffolé and Monfumo. It is located in a hilly viewpoint between Quartier del Piave and Montello, and it is crossed by the Prosecco and Conegliano-Valdobbiadene Hills Wine Road (Italian: Strada del Prosecco e Vini dei Colli Conegliano e Valdobbiadene) established in 1966. The municipality is in fact famous for the production of the Marzemino wine (called Colli di Conegliano Refrontolo Passito DOCG). Since July 7, 2019, Refrontolo's hills have been inscribed as an UNESCO World Heritage Site as The Prosecco Hills of Conegliano and Valdobbiadene (Italian: Le Colline del Prosecco di Conegliano e Valdobbiadene).

Refrontolo borders the following municipalities: Cison di Valmarino, Pieve di Soligo, San Pietro di Feletto, Susegana, Tarzo.

Demographics

Overview

In 2016 the natural growth rate of Refrotolo was -6.9, with 11 newborns, 23 deceased, and thus a natural balance of -12. The people entering Refrontolo from other municipalities were 43 (39 were instead leaving), the ones entering from abroad were 7 (5 were leaving Italy), while 1 was written in the registry because of administrative corrections (3 removed), for a total migratory balance of 4, and a migration rate of 2.3. Overall the total growth rate was decreasing (-4.6), and with a population of 1,747 on January 1, and 1,739 on December 31, the average number of people living in the municipality was 1,743.

Economy

The locality is particularly suited for wine production, thanks to the presence of constant currents of fresh and dry air that allow the natural drying of the grapes. In the municipality there are in fact fourteen wineries, and one of them is also a bottler. Typical, being the viticulture a rooted and integrated practice of the area, are the vineyards, historically cultivated as espaliers. Other forms of traditional and/or historical cultivation are the Sylvoz (espalier), overturned, and double-inverted. Cultivated vines are Prosecco, Marzemino, Verdiso Zentil, and Manzoni Bianco 6.0.13. The density of the vines is 2,500 Ha.

Refrontolo Passito DOCG
Marzemino has a centuries-old history, and distant origins. Also known in Veneto with the synonyms of Berzamino, Barzemin and Bassamino, it would later spread to Lombardy, Emilia, Friuli, and Trentino. It is believed that the Marzemino vine spread in Carinthia thanks to the Roman colonists, taking its name from Marzimin, a village in that region, and that from this area the cultivation subsequently extended to the Venetian regions. In the fifteenth century Marzemino was known throughout Padania and Friuli; in the Adige valley it was introduced by the militias of the Republic of Venice in the period of its maximum expansion. In fact, towards the middle of the sixteenth century the wine produced from this vine was one of the most appreciated among noble families, and it is precisely Marzemino that is mentioned in the second act of the famous opera Don Giovanni by Mozart, with the phrase "Versa il vino! Eccellente Marzimino!" (the quote is a clear reference to the Treviso area and not to the Trentino one, and everything is proven by the origin of Lorenzo Da Ponte, author of the libretto of Mozart's opera, who lived as a young man on these hills).

Today the Treviso vine is known as Marzemino of Refrontolo, from which the Refrontolo Passito is produced, and it is the drying technique that differentiates it from all the other varieties, making it unique and sought after as a "black pearl" in an area suited for white wines.

Refrontolo Passito is found within the Colli di Conegliano Refrontolo Passito DOCG zone, in a very limited area defined by the municipalities of Pieve di Soligo, San Pietro di Feletto, and in particular by the hills of Refrontolo, where the old biotype of Marzemino of Refrontolo is cultivated, since it is the only one that produces suitable grapes to obtain Refrontolo Passito. The Marzemino grapes are harvested in October, and they must be at least 95%, while the remaining 5% can be non-aromatic red grapes recommended or authorized by the province of Treviso. Subsequently the grapes are placed on traditional racks where they dry up until the week of Christmas in order to reach a minimum alcoholic strength of 14 degrees. The maximum yield of grapes into wine must not exceed 45%. The vinification is then followed by maturation in small oak barrels with various decantations up until it becomes clear for its bottling in spring. An aging in the bottle for at least three months precedes the release on the market, which cannot take place before March 1 after the harvest. Only about thirty companies produce the “pearl”, for an annual production of about 160,000 0.75cl-bottles, which are difficult to find, as admirers try to grab at least a few bottles of this excellence.

Refrontolo Passito is a structured and balanced red dessert wine, from grapes partially dried on racks of a beautiful deep ruby red color, with a characteristic and marked scent of blackberries. It should be accompanied by desserts with a not very high sugar content, therefore it perfectly combines with dry pastries, tart with plum jam, sbrisolona cake, but also with blue cheeses. It should be served at a temperature of 14-15°, and it presents itself as pleasant and moderately sweet, rich in aroma and flavors, with a well-centered alcohol content and a very pleasant level of acidity. It can be considered mature in 10–12 months of life.

Culture

Folklore

The bòna man
The tradition of New Year's greetings, involving above all the little ones, who, visiting the homes of relatives and acquaintances, received, in exchange of a greeting nursery rhyme (the bòna man), some sweets or some change. The custom was also widespread among the adults, and generally consisted of seasonal nuts.

'L panevìn
Fire ritual that still takes place, above all thanks to the initiative of the Pro Loco, on the evening of January 5, the epiphany's eve. Now practiced with folkloristic accents, once a tradition, rich in cultural meanings, consisting of different phases.

'L porzhèl de Sant'Antoni
It was a pig, donated by a devotee, who soon became accustomed to going around the houses of the village, where it received the lavadura. It was then killed on the day of Saint Anthony, January 17, put up for auction, and the proceeds donated to the poorest or to charitable works.

Carneval
Neighboring families, or those of the same district, were used to gather at the sound of an accordion, to dance and consume crostoi, frìtoe, and castagnòle. On the last Thursday of the carnival (dióba zhozhoèr) pieces of lard (zhózoi), or other pieces of pork, were offered to the beggars, who stuck them on wooden skewers, while during the last Friday of the carnival (vèndre gnocolèr), gnocchi were a must for the villagers.

San Valentin
The festivity is summarized in the proverb: San Valentin, the naranzhe picade al spin, translatable into Valentine's Day, the oranges attached to the thorn; lovers picked up a branch of hawthorn, and stuck an orange into each thorn. The homage was then placed, during the night, on the threshold of the beloved's house.

Organizations

Government

The municipality has its own functions, and those conferred by the state and regional laws, according to the principle of subsidiarity. It contributes to the determination of the objectives contained in the plans and the programs of the state and the regions and, within the boundaries of its legal competence, provides for their specification and implementation, as well as for the exercise of all the functions suitable to satisfy the interests and needs of the community, with the aim of reaching and consolidating, with a programming method, those values that allow a better quality of life, in compliance with the state and regional laws. The municipality can also carry out its functions through the activities that can be adequately exercised by the autonomous initiative of the citizens and their social formations.

The municipal governing body is composed by the Municipal Council, the City Committee, and the Mayor.

Municipal Council

Mayor
The mayor is the body responsible for the municipal administration, and performs functions of representation, presidency, and superintendency, and eventually of Government Officer as established by the Legislative Decree 267/2000, which also defines the procedures for his election, the cases of incompatibility and ineligibility to the office, its status, and the causes of termination and forfeiture of office.

Administrative duties
The mayor has competences and powers of direction, supervision and control of the activity of the assessors, and of the management and executive bodies, by the issuance of directives to the municipal secretary, the general manager, if appointed, and to the managers of the administrative services, verifying the compliance of the administrative management results in accordance with the given guidelines.

He appoints the members of the municipal council, choosing among them the deputy mayor, and has the power to revoke them by giving motivated communication to the council; he also appoints the managers of the public administration, assigning and defining the needed executive offices and the external collaboration assignments according to the criteria established by the articles 109 and 110 of the Legislative Decree 267/2000, as well as by the municipal statute and regulations.

Moreover he promotes and takes initiatives to ensure that the offices, services, special companies, institutions, and joint stock companies belonging to the municipality carry out their activities according to the guidelines indicated by the municipal council, or the objectives defined by the City Committee, summons the conference between the representatives of all the interested parties in order to verify the possibility of realizing the program agreement and promoting its conclusion (even at the request of one or more of the interested parties), and has initiative and liaison powers with the bodies of popular participation in the local administration, calling meetings for referendums on matters of exclusive local competence, and thus setting up the office for the referendum operations.

List of mayors of Refrontolo

Timeline

Notable people
Piero Dalle Ceste (1912-1974) –  Italian painter

Essential bibliography

Notes

References

Cities and towns in Veneto